Hazelwood  is a historic archaeological site located at Port Royal, Caroline County, Virginia. It was the site of the historic house and plantation "Hazelwood", home of political economist and U.S. Senator John Taylor of Caroline (1753-1824).  The house was built about 1750 and destroyed during the American Civil War.

Hazelwood was listed on the National Register of Historic Places in 1974.

References

Plantations in Virginia
Archaeological sites on the National Register of Historic Places in Virginia
National Register of Historic Places in Caroline County, Virginia
Zachary Taylor family